Bobby Cunliffe (27 December 1928 – 25 January 2000) was a footballer who played as a left winger in the Football League for Manchester City, Chesterfield and Southport.

References

1928 births
2000 deaths
Association football wingers
English footballers
Manchester City F.C. players
Chesterfield F.C. players
Southport F.C. players
English Football League players